Eynar may refer to:
Eynar, Iran, a village in Markazi Province, Iran
Eynar Veyksha, Soviet luger